Midsund is a village in Molde Municipality in Møre og Romsdal county, Norway. The village is located on the western end of the island of Otrøya. The eastern end of the Midsund Bridge is located in the village of Midsund, connecting it to the neighboring island of Midøya to the west.

This village is the site of most private commercial services such as a grocery store, bank, shops, restaurant, and gas stations for the Midsund area in Molde.

The village was the administrative center of the old Midsund Municipality until 2020 when it was merged into Molde Municipality.

References

Villages in Møre og Romsdal
Molde